The following are the football (soccer) events of the year 1904 throughout the world.

Events
28 February: S.L. Benfica is founded.
April - Woolwich Arsenal become the first Southern club to win promotion to the English top flight.
4 May: FC Schalke 04 is founded.
1 July: Bayer 04 Leverkusen is founded.
August: Leeds City is founded.
4 October: IFK Göteborg is founded.
Germany: SC Freiburg is founded.

Winners club national championship
Hungary:
Hungarian National Championship I: MTK, first-time champions
Italy:
Italian Football Championship: Genoa C.F.C.
Scotland:
Scottish Division One – Third Lanark
Scottish Division Two – Hamilton Academical
Scottish Cup – Celtic

International tournaments
1904 British Home Championship (February 29 – April 9, 1904)

Olympic Games in St. Louis, United States (November 16–23, 1904)
  (Galt Football Club)
  (Christian Brothers College)
  (St. Rose Parish)

Births
 January 21 – Puck van Heel, Dutch footballer (died 1984)
 September 1 – George Biswell, English club footballer (died 1981)
 September 13 – Luigi Bertolini, Italian footballer (died 1977)
 November 29 – Héctor Castro, Uruguayan footballer (died 1960)

Deaths

References 

 
Association football by year